The blue-billed black tyrant (Knipolegus cyanirostris) is a species of bird in the family Tyrannidae.
It is found in Argentina, Bolivia, Brazil, Paraguay, and Uruguay.
Its natural habitats are temperate forests, subtropical or tropical moist montane forests, subtropical or tropical high-altitude shrubland, and heavily degraded former forest.

References

blue-billed black tyrant
Birds of Brazil
Birds of Argentina
Birds of Uruguay
blue-billed black tyrant
Taxa named by Louis Jean Pierre Vieillot
Taxonomy articles created by Polbot